Mirzachoʻl is a district of Jizzakh Region in Uzbekistan. The capital lies at the city Gagarin.

The district consists of one city (Gagarin), 2 urban-type settlements (Paxtazor, Mirzadala) and 6 rural communities.

References 

Districts of Uzbekistan
Jizzakh Region